Kartepe is a town and district of Kocaeli Province, Turkey. The mayor is Şükrü Karabalık (AKP).

Geography 
It is almost merged to İzmit, the province center and it included in Greater Kocaeli (see Metropolitan centers in Turkey). Kartepe Mountains are to the south and Sapanca Lake is to the east of Kartepe. The urban population of Kartepe is 85847 as of 2010.

History 
Kartepe, then known as Köseköy, was founded in 1600s. After the Population exchange between Greece and Turkey agreement, Turks from Greece were settled in Köseköy in 1920s. Later people from Black Sea coast were also settled around Köseköy. Being a part of industrial area the population increased and in 1970 it was declared a seat of township. In 2008 it was merged to nearby towns, renamed as Kartepe and became a district center of Kocaeli Province. The municipality of Kartepe is now an intracity municipality of Greater Kocaeli.

Economy 
Industrial estates around Kartepe constitute the major revenue of the city. Another important sector is mountain tourism. Although Kartepe is founded in the low plains the mountains at the south serve as winter sports complex for nearby İstanbul citizens.

The rural area of the district 
There are 10 villages in the rural area of the district. The total population (urban+rural) of the district is 93,809.

References

External links 
 District governor's site

Populated places in Kocaeli Province
Districts of Kocaeli Province